The Farman HF.20 and its derivatives were a family of reconnaissance aircraft produced in France shortly before and during the First World War. It was a refined version of the Farman MF.11 "Shorthorn" that did away with the type's distinctive landing skids, and incorporated design features from Henri Farman's designs. It entered service with the French, Belgian and Serbian armies in 1913 (two aircraft conducted reconnaissance during the Siege of Scutari in the First Balkan War and one crashed), and with the British RFC and RNAS shortly after the outbreak of war. The type was also licence-built in the UK by Airco and Grahame-White.

The HF.20 was seriously underpowered, and a variety of engines were trialled in the hope of correcting this, none with much success. The problem was eventually solved only when an engine of twice the power of the original powerplant was fitted to the HF.27 variant, by which time the aircraft was already obsolete. Nevertheless, the performance of the HF.20 made it adequate for use on secondary fronts.

Variants

HF.20 original version with Gnome Lambda engine 
HF.21  span and increased wing area version with Gnome Lambda engine. At least one of the few built, entered service with the Fliegertruppe of Switzerland.
HF.22  span and increased wing area version with Gnome Lambda engine. 
HF.22 floatplane (aka HF.22bis or Savoia-built HF.22-H)
HF.23  span version with Gnome Lambda engine
HF.24  span aerobatic version with Gnome Lambda engine
HF.27  Canton-Unné R9 engine or  Renault engine with a revised undercarriage that included nose wheels similar to the Voisin III.

Operators

Argentine Air Force

Belgian Air Force

Royal Danish Air Force

Aéronautique Militaire
Escadrille HF 1
Escadrille HF 7
Escadrille HF 13
Escadrille HF 19
Escadrille HF 28
Escadrille HF 32

Royal Hellenic Navy

Corpo Aeronautico Militare

Imperial Japanese Navy Air Service

Royal Netherlands Air Force

Romanian Air Corps

Imperial Russian Air Service

Serbian Air Force

Soviet Air Force - Taken over from the Imperial Russian Air Force.

Swedish Air Force
Swedish Navy

Swiss Air Force

Royal Flying Corps
No. 2 Squadron RFC
No. 5 Squadron RFC
No. 6 Squadron RFC
No. 10 Squadron RFC
No. 24 Squadron RFC
No. 26 Squadron RFC
No. 30 Squadron RFC
No. 31 Squadron RFC
No. 32 Squadron RFC
No. 64 Squadron RFC
Royal Naval Air Service
 Union of South Africa
South African Aviation Corps

Specifications (HF.20)

References

Bibliography

 
 
 Thomas, Andrew. "In the Footsteps of Daedulus: Early Greek Naval Aviation". Air Enthusiast, No. 94, July–August 2001, pp. 8–9.

Further reading

 
 

HF.20
1910s French military trainer aircraft
1910s French military reconnaissance aircraft
Rotary-engined aircraft
Single-engined pusher aircraft
Sesquiplanes
Aircraft first flown in 1913